Ratina is a suburban community in the municipality of Kraljevo, Serbia. It is located 6 kilometers from the city center and has about 12,000 inhabitants.

Populated places in Raška District